Troy Kavon Caesar (born 13 May 1994) is a British Virgin Islands international footballer, who plays as a central defender for United Premier Soccer League side Potros FC.

Club career
After playing club football for VG Ballstarz, Caesar enrolled at Andrew College in 2015 where he played college soccer, making 27 appearances. After making the all-region first team for two years in a row, Caesar attended Life University. In October 2021, he joined United Premier Soccer League side Potros FC.

International career
Caesar made his international debut for British Virgin Islands in 2010.

Career statistics

Scores and results list British Virgin Islands' goal tally first, score column indicates score after each Caesar goal.

References

External links

1994 births
Living people
British Virgin Islands footballers
British Virgin Islands international footballers
British Virgin Islands expatriate footballers
British Virgin Islands expatriate sportspeople in the United States
Expatriate soccer players in the United States
Life University alumni
Association football defenders
Andrew College alumni